Merivale is a surname, and may refer to:

Charles Merivale (1808–1893), English historian and churchman
Herman Merivale (1806–1874), English civil servant and historian 
Herman Charles Merivale (1839–1906), English dramatist and poet, son of Herman Merivale
John Merivale (1917–1990), Canadian-British theatre actor
John Herman Merivale (1779–1844), English barrister and man of letters
Philip Merivale (1886–1946), English actor and screenwriter
Sir Henry Merrivale, fictional detective created by John Dickson Carr